Greg Kearney is a Canadian writer. He was a humour columnist for Xtra! from 1999 to 2005, and published his debut short story collection Mommy Daddy Baby in 2004.

Born in Kenora, Ontario, he is based in Toronto, where he studied theatre at York University.

He was awarded an Honour of Distinction from the Dayne Ogilvie Prize in 2009, and his second short story collection Pretty, published in 2011, won a ReLit Award in the short fiction category in 2012.

His first novel, The Desperates, was published by Cormorant Books in 2013.

He has also written several short plays for Buddies in Bad Times' annual Rhubarb Festival and Theatre Passe Muraille, including Fruits and Crosses, Margot and the Great Big Plate, The Cry Sisters, The Betty Dean Fanzine, (555) 555 5555 and Cancun. Cancun appears in the Sky Gilbert-edited anthology Perfectly Abnormal: Seven Gay Plays, published by Playwrights Canada Press in 2006, alongside plays by Harry Rintoul, Shawn Postoff, Christian Lloyd, Greg MacArthur, Ken Brand and Michael Achtman.

Works
Mommy Daddy Baby (2004)
Pretty (2011)
The Desperates (2013)

References

21st-century Canadian novelists
Canadian male novelists
Canadian male short story writers
20th-century Canadian dramatists and playwrights
21st-century Canadian dramatists and playwrights
Canadian humour columnists
Canadian gay writers
People from Kenora
Writers from Toronto
York University alumni
Living people
Canadian LGBT dramatists and playwrights
Canadian LGBT novelists
Canadian male dramatists and playwrights
21st-century Canadian short story writers
20th-century Canadian short story writers
20th-century Canadian male writers
21st-century Canadian male writers
Canadian male non-fiction writers
Year of birth missing (living people)
Gay dramatists and playwrights
Gay novelists
21st-century Canadian LGBT people
20th-century Canadian LGBT people